Obed-Edom  is a biblical name which in Hebrew means "servant of Edom," and which appears in the books of 2 Samuel and 1 and 2 Chronicles. The relationship between these passages has been the subject of scholarly discussions which express uncertainty and disagreements about the relationships between various passages that use the name.

Biblical texts
The following sections reflect every mention of the name Obed-Edom in the Hebrew Bible.

Obed-Edom in Samuel
In 1 Samuel 4, the Philistines, a neighboring people, capture the Ark of the Covenant, also known as the "Ark of God", a sacred object of the Israelites, during the Battle of Aphek. The Philistines then take the Ark into their own territory, leading God to attack the Philistines with illness (1 Samuel 5). Eventually, the Philistines realize that they cannot safely keep the Ark, and place it on a cart pulled by two cattle, who return it to the Israelites along with a peace-offering (1 Samuel 6). After this, the Israelites take it to the "house of Abinadab", where it remains for twenty years (1 Samuel 7:1-2).

Eventually, the Israelite king David decides to bring the ark from the "house of Abinadab" to his new stronghold in Jerusalem (2 Samuel 6:1-2). The ark is placed on an ox-cart driven by Uzzah and Ahio, Abinadab's sons, in a festive atmosphere (2 Samuel 6:3-5). At one point, the ark rocks violently as the oxen pull it, and Uzzah sticks out his hand to steady the Ark, and so God strikes Uzzah dead (2 Samuel 6:7). David temporarily abandons his plan to move the ark to his city.
So David would not remove the ark of the LORD unto him into the city of David; but David carried it aside into the house of Obed-edom the Gittite. And the ark of the LORD remained in the house of Obed-edom the Gittite three months; and the LORD blessed Obed-edom, and all his house.
When David hears that the LORD has blessed the house of Obed-edom, he decides to move the Ark to Jerusalem as originally planned. Rev. F. Gardiner, in Ellicott's Commentary for Modern Readers, stresses that "this implies neither jealousy nor a wish to deprive his subject (Obed-edom) of a blessing. It had been his original purpose to carry the ark to Jerusalem, and he had only desisted in a fit of vexation and then of fear. He now saw that such fear was groundless, and went on to the completion of his unfinished action."

Obed-Edom in 1 Chronicles

Moving the Ark
1 Chronicles 13 also relates the incident concerning the death of Uzzah. Following the death of Uzzah, the biblical text says, "And David was afraid of God that day, saying: 'How shall I bring the ark of God home to me?' So David removed not the ark unto him into the city of David, but carried it aside into the house of Obed-edom the Gittite. And the ark of God remained with the family of Obed-edom in his house three months; and the LORD blessed the house of Obed-edom, and all that he had" (1 Chronicles 13:12-14).

1 Chronicles 14 then relates various details of David's kingdom, including David's successes in international relations, the birth of several children, and David's successful war against the Philistines. Following the fighting with the Philistines, the narrative returns its attention to the Ark.

"And [David] made him houses in the city of David; and he prepared a place for the ark of God, and pitched for it a tent. Then David said: 'None ought to carry the ark of God but the Levites; for them hath the LORD chosen to carry the ark of the LORD, and to minister to Him for ever'" (1 Chronicles 15:1-2, Jewish Publication Society Version of 1917). David then calls an assembly and gathers a large number of Levites in preparation for moving the Ark (15:3-11).  Calling to mind the disaster with Uzzah, David provides instructions for the proper handling of the Ark to avoid a repeat of the incident (15:12-13). The Levites prepare themselves and carry the Ark in an appropriate manner (15:14-15). David then tells the Levites to appoint some Levites for playing music, with instruments and singing (15:16).

"So the Levites appointed Heman the son of Joel; and of his brethren, Asaph the son of Berechiah; of the sons of Merari their brethrean, Ethan the son of Kushaiah; and with them their breathren of the second degree, Zechariah, Ben, . . . and Eliphalehu, and Mikneiah, and Obed-edom, and Jeiel, the doorkeepers" (15:17-18).

"So the singers, Heman, Asaph, and Ethan, [were appointed,] with cymbals of brass to sound aloud; and Zechariah, and Aziel, . . . and Maaseiah, and Benaiah, with psalteries set to Alamoth; and Mattithiah, and Eliphalehu, and Mikneiah, and Obed-edom, and Jeiel, and Azaziah, with harps on the Sheminith, to lead" (15:19-21).

"And Chenaniah, chief of the Levites, was over the song; he was master in the song, because he was skillful. And Berechiah and Elkanah were doorkeepers for the ark. And Shebaniah, and Joshaphat, and Nethanel, . . . and Zechariah, and Benaiah, and Eliezer, the priests, did blow with the trumpets before the ark of God; and Obed-edom and Jehiah were doorkeepers for the ark. So David, and the elders of Israel, and the captains over thousands, went to bring up the ark of the covenant of the LORD out of the house of Obed-edom with joy" (15:22-25).

Then further festivities related to the event are related (15:26-16:3).

"And he appointed certain of the Levites to minister before the ark of the LORD, and to celebrate and to thank and praise the LORD, the God of Israel: Asaph the chief, and second to him, Zechariah, Jeiel, and Shemiramoth, and Jehiel, and Mattithiah, and Eliab, and Benaiah, and Obed-edom, and Jeiel, with psalteries and with harps; and Asaph with cymbals, sounding aloud; and Benaiah and Jehaziel the priests with trumpets continually, before the ark of the covenant of God" (16:4-6).

This is followed by an extensive poem of praise (16:8-36).

"So he left there, before the ark of the covenant of the LORD, Asaph and his brethren, to minister before the ark continually, as every day's work required; and Obed-edom with their brethren, threescore and eight; Obed-edom also the son of Jeduthun and Hosah to be door-keepers . . ." (16:37-38 Various other details follow.

1 Chronicles 26
Later, in 1 Chronicles 26, a genealogical passage references the name Obed-edom. Verse 1 introduces a list of doorkeepers, beginning with Korahites, specifically a man named Meshelemiah and his sons (verses 1-3).

After the mention of Meshelemiah's sons, Chronicles reads, "And Obed-Edom had sons: Shemaiah the first-born, Jehozabad the second, Joah the third, . . . Issachar the seventh, Peullethai the eighth; for God blessed him" (verses 4-5). Verses 6 through 7 name six grandsons of Obed-edom by Shemaiah. Verse 8 concludes, "All these were the sons of Obed-edom: they and their sons and their brethren, able men in strength for the service; threescore and two of Obed-edom."

The chapter relates that lots were cast to assign positions to the doorkeepers, and that the lot fell "To Obed-edom southward; and to his sons the Storehouse" (verse 15).

Obed-Edom in 2 Chronicles
2 Chronicles 25 relates events that it claims occurred during the reign of king Jehoash of Israel and Amaziah of Judah. They reigned at the same time around approximately 800-775 BCE. This is at least one or two centuries after the period when David would have reigned (somewhere in the range of 1050-925 BCE). The chapter relates that Jehoash attacked Amaziah, and came to Jerusalem, "And [he took] all the gold and silver, and all the vessels that were found in the house of God with Obed-edom, and the treasures of the king's house, the hostages also, and returned to Samaria" (25:24).

Scholarly Views

Several scholars have noted the existence of uncertainties and disagreements about the Obed-Edom passages. However, most scholars agree that in the name "Obed-Edom the Gittite," (as he is called in 2 Samuel 6 and 1 Chronicles 13) the term "Gittite" refers originally to a Philistine (and therefore a non-Israelite man). However, in Chronicles "Obed-edom is assigned a levitical pedigree," that is, is described as a Levite, an Israelite member of the tribe entrusted with holy responsibilities. This description as a Levite is "usually regarded as the Chronicler's own interpretation." As a result of these differing interpretations, several scholars have proposed that the Chronicler has altered the original description of a Philistine Obed-edom in order to make the character a Levite.

References

People associated with David
Books of Chronicles people